Hassan Ali Atwi Mehanna (born 29 January 1997) is a Lebanese footballer who plays as a striker for  club Nejmeh and the Lebanon national team.

Club career

Early career 
Mehanna began his career in the Lebanese Premier League for Nejmeh in 2015, before playing for Shabab Arabi and Safa.

Sevan 
In February 2020, during the winter transfer season, Mehanna joined Armenian First League side Sevan. He scored one goal in three appearances, before the 2019–20 season was cancelled due to the COVID-19 pandemic.

On 15 August 2020, Mehanna renewed his contract with Sevan for an additional season. On 28 October 2020, Mehanna and Sevan mutually terminated his contract; he had scored two goals and made one assist in three league games. Mehanna scored five goals and assisted six goals in all competitions.

Return to Safa 
On 22 December 2020, Mehanna returned to Safa in Lebanon.

Bourj 
On 30 July 2021, Mehanna joined Bourj.

Naft Maysan 
In January 2022, Mehanna moved to Naft Maysan in the Iraqi Premier League.

Return to Nejmeh 
On 16 May 2022, Mehanna returned to Nejmeh on a three-year contract.

International career 
Mehanna represented Lebanon internationally at under-20 level at the 2017 Jeux de la Francophonie, scoring a goal against Guinea. He made his senior debut on 24 March 2022, in the 2022 FIFA World Cup qualification, coming on as a substitute in a 3–0 defeat to Syria.

Career statistics

International

References

External links

 
 
 
 

1997 births
Living people
Footballers from Beirut
Lebanese footballers
Association football forwards
Nejmeh SC players
Al Shabab Al Arabi Club Beirut players
Safa SC players
Sevan FC players
Bourj FC players
Naft Maysan FC players
Lebanese Premier League players
Armenian First League players
Iraqi Premier League players
Lebanon youth international footballers
Lebanon international footballers
Lebanese expatriate footballers
Lebanese expatriate sportspeople in Armenia
Lebanese expatriate sportspeople in Iraq
Expatriate footballers in Armenia
Expatriate footballers in Iraq